Wangsimni-dong is a part of Seongdong, a district of Seoul, South Korea.

References

Neighbourhoods of Seongdong District